Matthew Weston Goss (born 29 September 1968) is an English singer-songwriter and musician. He was the lead singer of 1980s pop group Bros, which also featured his twin brother Luke as the drummer. Goss as a solo artist has released five studio albums.

Goss wrote the theme song for So You Think You Can Dance, produced by Nigel Lythgoe.

Early life
Matthew Goss was born on 29 September 1968 at Lewisham Hospital, in the London borough of Lewisham. He is the twin and younger brother of Luke Goss.

Career

Goss became famous as lead singer of the English pop band, Bros. Bros' debut album, Push, went platinum four times, earned 8 top five hits and remained on the U.K. charts for 54 weeks.

He began his solo career in 1995, and by early 2021 had released 23 singles, four of which have been Top 40 hits. Goss worked with Paul Oakenfold on the single "Firefly", which was remixed and reached #1 on the World Trance chart. 

In June 2009, it was announced that he would be playing live shows at the Palms Casino Resort in Las Vegas. Within nine months, the show was successful and transferred to Caesars Palace in January 2010. Some have called Goss "The New King of Las Vegas".

The Vegas show was brought to UK venues including the Royal Albert Hall (London), and Wembley Arena (London) where he won the SSE Arena Award for Best Show of 2016.

2018 saw the release of the BAFTA-winning movie about his and his brother's life entitled Bros: After the Screaming Stops.

In early 2020, Goss recorded his version of "If I Aint Got You", which was produced by Babyface. The song was released as a fundraiser for the NHS during the Covid pandemic, Goss wanted to raise £50,000, but after three months, it raised just over £15,000.

Goss released his fifth studio album, The Beautiful Unknown, which was originally scheduled for release in September 2021, before being released on 25 March 2022. The album charted at number 7 on the UK official charts for one week and sold 8000 copies globally. "It's a phrase I use a lot in my poetry ... because I think inherently we have been programmed to actually fear tomorrow and ... the years ahead ... I just want to live in a place where the unknown is a beautiful thing." Goss said he had no interest in making music or singing again, due to his rigorous schedule performing in the United States. However, with the COVID-19 pandemic, Goss had a chance to reset and record again. "So it was quite an extraordinary thing, ironically, the connection that I found talking about much deeper issues, was the reason I actually ended up wanting to make a new record, and realising there were indeed people that wanted me to keep going." Goss stated he felt excited for the release of the album with the hope that the music industry takes notice of his efforts. "I want to compete with Ed Sheeran, I want to compete with The Weeknd, I want to compete with Robbie Williams...everyone. I made this record knowing 100% that we can do that. I want to be one of the main players. No-one can say this isn't a contemporary record."

In addition to his solo work, Goss has confirmed plans to re-unite with brother Luke on an "outrageous" Bros comeback album.

Goss expressed an interest in collaborating with Adele. "I’d love to sing with Adele and I think we’d gel really well together. We’re both Londoners, which really appeals to me."

In August 2022 Goss was announced as the eighth contestant on the 20th series of Strictly Come Dancing. Partnered with pro-dancer Nadiya Bychkova, Goss finished in the bottom two and came up against Kaye Adams in the dance off for a place in week 3. Goss won the majority of votes from the studio expert judges. Goss and Bychkova were eliminated in week 4, on October 16th 2022, after a dance off with Kym Marsh and her partner, Graziano di Prima.

Bibliography
Goss authored two books: the best-selling More Than You Know: The Autobiography, published in 2005, and Bear Crimbo, a children's story and intellectual property which had been in the process of a major release worldwide for Christmas 2021.

Personal life
Goss is an avid runner. As of April 2022, he is dating jeweller Chantal Brown. Goss suffers from Poland syndrome, a disorder which affects musculature of the body.

Discography

Studio albums

Singles

As featured artist

References

External links 
 
 

1968 births
Living people
British identical twins
English male singer-songwriters
Bros (British band) members
Musicians from London
People from Lewisham
English expatriates in the United States
English twins